Nepean Sportsplex is a sports facility in Ottawa, Ontario, Canada. It is located at 1701 Woodroffe Avenue north of the Ottawa Greenbelt, near the former Confederation High School along OC Transpo routes 74 and 75 in the former city of Nepean. This is the home arena to the Nepean Raiders hockey team of the Central Canada Hockey League.

History 

Nepean Sportsplex was built in 1973 as a central facility for the former city of Nepean. The site contains an athletics centre (including fitness room) & gym, baseball, soccer and football fields, 4 squash courts, convention space, swimming pools, lawn bowling, 10 curling sheets, and three ice rinks including a 3000-seat arena.  In addition to nearby neighbourhoods, the Sportsplex served the community of Barrhaven until the Walter Baker Sports Centre was constructed in 1980.  In 1997, the 3000-seat arena was named Steve Yzerman Arena in recognition of Steve Yzerman of the Detroit Red Wings, who played with the Nepean Raiders hockey team in his youth. The Ottawa Junior Riders of the Quebec Junior Football League also play here.

The Sportsplex was the site of Ottawa's first mass vaccination clinic during the COVID-19 Pandemic.

Facilities
Nepean Squash Club:

Began with 4 squash courts and an upstairs viewing gallery in 1974 and called itself the Nepean Squash Racquets Club.

Then 4 more courts were added in 1976. 

By 2004, only 6 courts remained to make way for a weight room, and by 2008, only 4 courts remained.

Active membership of over 100 club players with House League, City League, Tournaments, Round Robins, Socials and Lessons.

Foyer Gallery
The facility includes the Foyer Gallery, an artist-run exhibition space that operates under the auspices of the Foyer Gallery Artists’ Association and the City of Ottawa.  The gallery features visual art by established and emerging regional artists.

Notable events
The facility hosted 8 games in the 2013 IIHF Women's World Championship. 
The facility hosted the 2000 Ontario Nokia Cup, the provincial men's curling championship.

References

External links
Nepean Sportsplex 
Nepean Squash Club Website
Foyer Gallery

Indoor ice hockey venues in Ontario
Soccer venues in Ontario
Sports venues in Ottawa
Art museums and galleries in Ontario